Thomas or Tom Harper or Tommy Harper may refer to:

Tom Harper (actor) (born 1977), British film and television actor
Tom Harper (American football) (c. 1937–1989), American football coach
Tom Harper (director) (born 1980), British director of The Borrowers (2011) and The Woman in Black: Angel of Death (2014)
Tom Harper, pseudonym for novelist Edwin Thomas
Tommy Harper (born 1940), baseball player
Thomas Morton Harper (1821–1893), English theologian and preacher
Thomas Harper (1829–1899), Mormon pioneer, bishop and namesake of Harper Ward, Utah
Thomas Harper, fictional character in the film Jack Ryan: Shadow Recruit
Thomas Harper (trumpeter) (1786–1853), English trumpet player

See also
Thomas Harpur (born 1944), Irish former cricketer
Tom Harpur (1929–2017), Canadian author and priest